DeWayne "D.J." Stewart Jr. (born July 28, 1999) is an American professional basketball player for the Sioux Falls Skyforce of the NBA G League. He played college basketball for the Mississippi State Bulldogs.

High school career
Stewart attended Riverside High School in Avon, Mississippi. As a freshman, Stewart averaged 15.2 points, 6.4 rebounds and 2.8 assists per game. In his sophomore season, he averaged 17.4 points, 6.2 rebounds and 3.1 assists per game. Entering his junior season, he did not receive any NCAA Division I offers. As a junior, Stewart averaged 18.9 points, 9.7 rebounds and 3.1 assists per game. He averaged 25.3 points, 10.7 rebounds and 2.9 assists per game and was named All-State by The Clarion-Ledger in his senior season. He committed to playing college basketball for Mississippi State over offers from Alabama, Illinois and Ole Miss. He was rated a four-star recruit by Rivals.

College career
Stewart redshirted his first season at Mississippi State because head coach Ben Howland did not expect him to receive significant playing time. As a freshman, he averaged 8.5 points and 2.5 rebounds per game. On December 12, 2020, Stewart scored a career-high 32 points in an 85–82 double overtime loss to Dayton. As a sophomore, he averaged 16 points, 3.4 rebounds and 3.1 assists per game. He earned Second Team All-Southeastern Conference (SEC) honors from the league's coaches. Stewart was one of three finalists for the Howell Trophy. On April 1, 2021, he declared for the 2021 NBA draft while maintaining his college eligibility. He later signed with an agent, forgoing his remaining eligibility.

Professional career

Sioux Falls Skyforce (2021–present)
After going undrafted in the 2021 NBA draft, Stewart joined the Miami Heat for the 2021 NBA Summer League. On August 17, 2021, he signed with the Heat. Stewart was waived before the start of the season and joined the Sioux Falls Skyforce as an affiliate player.

On March 4, 2022, Stewart signed a two-way contract with the San Antonio Spurs. However, Stewart did not appeared in any one of the games for the San Antonio Spurs. 

On September 21, 2022, the Dallas Mavericks announced that they had signed Stewart. He was waived before the start of the season on October 13, 2022.

On October 24, 2022, Stewart rejoined the Sioux Falls Skyforce roster for training camp.

Career statistics

College

|-
| style="text-align:left;"| 2018–19
| style="text-align:left;"| Mississippi State
| style="text-align:center;" colspan=11|  Redshirt
|-
| style="text-align:left;"| 2019–20
| style="text-align:left;"| Mississippi State
| 31 || 17 || 29.6 || .456 || .329 || .700 || 2.5 || 1.6 || 1.0 || .2 || 8.5
|-
| style="text-align:left;"| 2020–21
| style="text-align:left;"| Mississippi State
| style="background:#cfecec;"|33* || style="background:#cfecec;"|33* || 35.0 || .410 || .344 || .806 || 3.4 || 3.1 || 1.4 || .2 || 16.0
|- class=sortbottom
| style="text-align:center;" colspan=2| Career
| 64 || 50 || 32.4 || .425 || .339 || .772 || 3.0 || 2.4 || 1.2 || .2 || 12.4

References

External links
Mississippi State Bulldogs bio

1999 births
Living people
American men's basketball players
Basketball players from Mississippi
Mississippi State Bulldogs men's basketball players
Shooting guards
Sioux Falls Skyforce players